KHDC (90.9 FM) is a radio station  broadcasting a Spanish Variety format. Licensed to Chualar, California, United States, the station serves the Salinas Valley and Monterey areas.  The station is currently owned by Radio Bilingue, Inc.

See also
List of community radio stations in the United States

References

External links

HDC
Radio stations established in 1981
HDC
1970 establishments in California
Community radio stations in the United States